Sundar Raj is an Indian actor in the Kannada film industry (Sandalwood). Some of the notable films of Sundar Raj as an actor include Tabbaliyu Neenade Magane, Ondanondu Kaladalli, Chandanada Gombe, Kurigalu Saar Kurigalu (2001), Mathadana (2001), Aakasmika (1993).

Career
Sundar Raj has been part of more than 180 movies in Kannada. He has served as the Secretary of the Kannada Film Artist Association.

Selected filmography

 Style King (2016)
 Aatagara (2015)
 Ravana (2009)
 Samarasimha Nayka (2005)
 Kurigalu Saar Kurigalu (2001)
 Diggajaru (2001)
 Nyayakkagi Saval (1994)
 Vijaya Kranthi (1993)
 Mana Gedda Maga (1992)
 Gagana (1989)
 Kindari Jogi (1989)
 Bhadrakali (1987)
 Ondu Muttina Kathe (1987)
 Samsarada Guttu (1986)
 Savira Sullu (1985)
 Onde Raktha (1984)
 Nanna Devaru (1982)
 Ondanondu Kaladalli (1979)
 KAADU (1973)

Personal life
Sundar Raj is married to Pramila Joshai, and they have a daughter named Meghana Raj. Both Pramila Joshai and Meghana Raj are Indian film actors in the Kannada film industry, while Meghana has worked mostly in Malayalam and with a few Telugu and Tamil films.Sundar Raj is a Hindu married to Pramila Joshai a catholic.

See also

List of people from Karnataka
Cinema of Karnataka
List of Indian film actors
Cinema of India

References

External links

  Biography of Sundar Raj on bookmyshow.com

Male actors in Kannada cinema
Indian male film actors
Male actors from Karnataka
20th-century Indian male actors
21st-century Indian male actors
Living people
1951 births